Christoffel van Spoelberch, Lord of Lovenjoel (1633–1707) was the youngest son of Ferdinand van Spoelberch, Lord of Lovenjoel and Anne de Grimaldi.

After the death of his father in 1675 he became Lord of Lovenjoel. He married Lady Johanna Catharina Becx, with descendance upon the current day.

During his career he was Lord Mayor of Leuven.

Ancestry

References

Belgian nobility
Christophe

1633 births
1707 deaths